Ralph Brown Draughon (September 1, 1899 – August 13, 1968) was the President of Auburn University from 1947 to 1965.

Biography
Ralph Brown Draughon was born in Hartford, Alabama, in 1899. He graduated from Alabama Polytechnic Institute, now known as Auburn University, with a B.S. in 1922 and an M.S. in 1929. He was a member of the Phi Gamma Delta fraternity. In 1931, he became an Assistant Professor of History and Political Science at Auburn.

A library at Auburn University was named after him in 1966.

References

1899 births
1968 deaths
People from Hartford, Alabama
Auburn University alumni
Auburn University faculty
Presidents of Auburn University
20th-century American academics